Lazenby is a place near Middlesbrough in the borough of Redcar and Cleveland in North Yorkshire, England.

Lazenby may also refer to:

Lazenby, a place near Northallerton in the parish of Danby Wiske with Lazenby in North Yorkshire, England
 Lazenby (surname), a surname
 18965 Lazenby, a main-belt asteroid
 Lazenby (Rave Master), a character in the manga series Rave Master

See also
Lasenby, a surname